The Disney Professorship of Archaeology is an endowed chair in archaeology at the University of Cambridge. It was endowed by English barrister and antiquarian John Disney in 1851 with a donation of £1,000. He arranged for a further £3,500 bequest upon his death in 1857.

 Disney Professors have also served as the Directors of the McDonald Institute for Archaeological Research, which was founded in 1990.

List of Disney Professors of Archaeology 

 1851–1865 John Howard Marsden
 1865–1879 Churchill Babington
 1879–1887 Percy Gardner
 1887–1892 George Forrest Browne
 1892–1926 William Ridgeway
 1926–1938 Ellis Minns
 1939–1952 Dorothy Garrod
 1952–1974 Grahame Clark
 1974–1981 Glyn Daniel
 1981–2004 Colin Renfrew
 2004–2014 Graeme Barker
 2014– Cyprian Broodbank

See also 
 List of professorships at the University of Cambridge

References

Further reading 

Tilley, C.Y., 1989, "Discourse and power: The genre of the Cambridge inaugural lecture." In Miller, D., Rowlands, M., and Tilley, C.Y. (Eds), Domination and Resistance. London: Routledge.

External links

Department of Archaeology, University of Cambridge

Archaeology of the United Kingdom
Archaeological organizations
Archaeology, Disney
Faculty of Human, Social, and Political Science, University of Cambridge
1851 establishments in England
Archaeology, Disney